Luka Lončar (born 26 June 1987) is a Croatian professional water polo player. He was part of the Croatian team at the 2016 Summer Olympics, where the team won the silver medal.

Honours

Club
 Mladost 
LEN Euro Cup runners-up : 2013–14
AN Brescia
Coppa Italia: 2011–12
Jug Dubrovnik 
LEN Champions League:2015–16 ;runners-up: 2016–17
LEN Super Cup: 2016
Croatian Championship:  2015–16, 2016–17, 2017–18, 2018–19
Croatian Cup: 2015–16, 2016–17, 2017–18, 2018–19
Adriatic League: 2015–16, 2016–17, 2017–18
Pro Recco
LEN Champions League: 2021–22
 LEN Super Cup: 2021
Serie A1: 2021–22
Coppa Italia: 2021–22

Awards
Member of the World Team: 2017, 2018 by total-waterpolo
 Adriatic League MVP:  2016–17 with Jug Dubrovnik
2017 World Championship Team of the Tournament
 Croatian Water Polo Player of the Year: 2018 with Jug Dubrovnik

See also
 List of Olympic medalists in water polo (men)
 List of world champions in men's water polo
 List of World Aquatics Championships medalists in water polo

References

External links
 

1987 births
Living people
Sportspeople from Zagreb
Croatian male water polo players
Water polo centre forwards
Water polo players at the 2016 Summer Olympics
Medalists at the 2016 Summer Olympics
Olympic silver medalists for Croatia in water polo
World Aquatics Championships medalists in water polo
Competitors at the 2013 Mediterranean Games
Mediterranean Games medalists in water polo
Mediterranean Games gold medalists for Croatia
Water polo players at the 2020 Summer Olympics
Expatriate water polo players
Croatian expatriate sportspeople in Italy